Okmulgee may refer to:
 Okmulgee, Oklahoma
 Okmulgee County, Oklahoma

See also
Ocmulgee River
Ocmulgee Mounds National Historical Park